Periploca ceanothiella, the ceanothus stem gall moth, is a moth in the family Cosmopterigidae. It was described by Cosens in 1908. It is found in North America, where it has been recorded from Arizona, California, Florida, Kansas, Indiana, Louisiana, Mississippi, New York, Ontario, Oregon, South Carolina and Texas.

Wingspan 10 mm. The moth flies from March to August and in December.

The larvae feed on Ceanothus species. Young larvae bore into the stem of their host plant. The feeding causes stem galls. The species overwinters in the larval stage within the gall. Pupation takes place in summer.

References

Natural History Museum Lepidoptera generic names catalog

Chrysopeleiinae
Moths described in 1908
Moths of North America